Bromoketoprogesterone (BKP), also known as 9α-bromo-11-oxoprogesterone (BOP), and known by the tentative brand name Braxarone (Squibb), is an orally active progestin which does not appear to have been marketed.

Pharmacology

Pharmacodynamics
Whereas 11-ketoprogesterone and 11β-hydroxyprogesterone are virtually devoid of progestogenic activity (although 11β-hydroxyprogesterone has been reported to possess about 1% of the progestogenic activity of progesterone), the progestogenic activity of BKP is restored and is in fact relatively high. In contrast, 9α-fluoro-11β-hydroxyprogesterone has much lower progestogenic activity with only about 8 times that of 11β-hydroxyprogesterone. In addition, whereas 9α-fluoro-11β-hydroxyprogesterone has pronounced mineralocorticoid effects, BKP lacks such effects.

BKP has been described as a weaker progestogen. It has been used at doses of as much as 300 mg orally per day.

In addition to its activity as a progestogen, BKP has glucocorticoid activity.

Pharmacokinetics
The pharmacokinetics of BKP have been reviewed.

Chemistry

Synthesis
Chemical syntheses of BKP have been published.

History
It was developed in the 1950s and, along with the testosterone derivatives ethisterone, norethisterone, normethandrone, and norethandrolone and the progesterone derivative hydroxyprogesterone acetate, was one of the first orally active progestogens to be developed. Similarly to various other progestogens, BKP has been studied in the treatment of breast cancer in women. Evaluated in 1959, it was the first oral progestin to be found effective in the treatment of breast cancer. It induced regression in 20% of women with advanced breast cancer at a dosage of 300 mg/day orally.

See also
 Flugestone
 Fluorometholone
 Haloprogesterone
 Medrysone

References

Abandoned drugs
Glucocorticoids
Hormonal antineoplastic drugs
Organobromides
Pregnanes
Progestogens
Triketones